Somali Reconciliation Conference may refer to:

 Conference on National Reconciliation in Somalia (1993)
 2002 Somali Reconciliation Conference (2002)
 2007 Somali National Reconciliation Conference (2007)